Capa is an unincorporated community in Jones County, South Dakota, United States.

History
Capa was laid out in 1908, soon after the railroad was extended into the area. The name Capa is derived from a Sioux-language word meaning "beaver". A post office called Capa was established in 1907, and remained in operation until it was discontinued in 1976.

References

Unincorporated communities in Jones County, South Dakota
Unincorporated communities in South Dakota